The second HMS Vanity (D28, later L38) was a V-class destroyer of the British Royal Navy that saw service in World War I and World War II.

Construction and commissioning

Vanity was ordered on 30 June 1916 as part of the 9th Order of the 1916–17 Naval Programme. She was laid down on 28 July 1917 by William Beardmore and Company at Dalmuir, Scotland, and launched on 3 May 1918. She was commissioned on 21 June 1918.

Service history

World War I and interwar years
Vanity saw service in the last months of World War I, which ended with the armistice with Germany on 11 November 1918. She took part in the Baltic campaigns of the allied intervention in the Russian civil war. Vanity remained in service until the 1930s, when she was decommissioned and placed in reserve.

Vanity was recommissioned in August 1939 for the Royal Review of the Reserve Fleet by King George VI.

World War II

After the United Kingdom entered World War II in September 1939, Vanity was assigned to the 15th Destroyer Flotilla at Rosyth, Scotland, for convoy escort and patrol duties in the North Sea. Later in the month she was selected for conversion into an antiaircraft escort, and underwent conversion from October 1939 to June 1940. In July 1940 she underwent post-conversion acceptance trials, and was accepted for service on 12 August 1940, when her pennant number was changed from D29 to L38. She then returned to convoy escort duty in the North Sea. In December 1941, she was "adopted" by the village of Winteringham (Lincolnshire), in a Warship Week National Savings campaign.

Vanity interrupted her regular duties in January 1942 to take part in Operation Performance, steaming to Scapa Flow in the Orkney Islands to deploy with the Home Fleet to cover the break-out of merchant ships from Sweden into the North Sea via the Danish Straits. In February 1942, she returned to her convoy escort and patrol duties in the North Sea, which she carried out until February 1945. She did not take part in operations related to the Allied invasion of Normandy in the summer of 1944.

In February 1945, Vanity was reassigned to convoy escort and patrol duty in the English Channel, where North Atlantic convoys had been rerouted after the threat of German air attacks from France had abated, to reinforce convoy defences in the face of increased activity by German snorkel-equipped submarines in the area. She continued these operations until the surrender of Germany in early May 1945.

Decommissioning and disposal
Vanity was decommissioned soon after Germanys surrender – she no longer was carried on the Royal Navys active list as of July 1945 – and was placed in reserve. Placed on the disposal list in 1946, she was sold on 4 March 1947 for scrapping at Grangemouth, Scotland.

Notes

Bibliography

External links

 Naval History: HMS VANITY  (D 28) - V & W-class Destroyer
 uboat.net HMS Vanity (L 38)

 

V and W-class destroyers of the Royal Navy
Ships built on the River Clyde
1918 ships
World War I destroyers of the United Kingdom
World War II destroyers of the United Kingdom